The 1928 Rhode Island gubernatorial election was held on November 6, 1928. Incumbent Republican Norman S. Case defeated Democratic nominee Alberic A. Archambault with 51.59% of the vote.

General election

Candidates
Major party candidates
Norman S. Case, Republican
Alberic A. Archambault, Democratic

Other candidates
Charles F. Bishop, Socialist Labor
Edward W. Theinert, Workers

Results

References

1928
Rhode Island
Gubernatorial